No.1 is the eighth and final Korean extended play (tenth overall) by South Korean girl group CLC. It was released digitally on January 30, 2019, and physically on January 31, by Cube Entertainment and distributed by Kakao M. It features five tracks, including the lead single "No".

Background and release 
After revealing a comeback schedule, it was reported on January 17, 2019 that the group would be releasing No.1, their eighth extended play recording.

The EP was released through several music portals on January 30, 2019, including MelOn, iTunes and Spotify.

Promotion 

Prior to announcing the group's comeback, Cube Entertainment placed an advertisement at the intersection of subway line 2 - Samseong station, Seongsu station - Ttukseom station and Seoul Forest station - Seongdong Gu Bridge intersection.

On January 20, 2019, it was confirmed that CLC would guest on Weekly Idol, the group's first variety show for their comeback with No.1, marking their first appearance on the program as a group of seven. Cube Entertainment released individual and group photos on January 20 and 21, respectively, followed by the track list on January 22 and audio snippets on January 23.  Individual and MV teasers were released from January 24–28.

The same day, a premiere showcase hosted by Mnet was broadcast through Naver and Mnet-M2. CLC is the first girl group to have their own show, after BTS, Wanna One and Got7. They performed lead single "No" and several other songs from the EP as well as tracks from Black Dress. The group also appeared as guests on Idol Radio to promote the album.

Music video 
The music video was released alongside the EP on January 30. Within 24 hours, the video had surpassed 2.2 million views on YouTube.

On 14 February "No" music video surpassed 10 million combined views for the official music video uploaded on 1theK's channel and CLC's official channel.
As of June 2019 music video has over 21 million views combined on both channels.

Track listing

Charts

Album

Weekly charts

Single

"No" Weekly charts

Accolades

Music program awards

Release history

Notes

References 

Cube Entertainment EPs
CLC (group) EPs
2019 EPs
Albums produced by Jeon So-yeon